Manchester GATE is an elementary school in Fresno, California. It has won many awards including one in Redbook. The new principal is Janet Gengozian and the new vice principal is Mr. Daryn Sassano. G.A.T.E. is an acronym for Gifted And Talented Education. Manchester GATE serves grades 2–6. With a student-teacher ratio of 26:1, Manchester GATE had an enrollment of 739 students in 2007.

In 2007, Manchester GATE received the National No Child Left Behind Title I Distinguished Schools Recognition Award. It was only one of two schools in California to receive this award for that school year.

In 2012, Manchester GATE achieved an Academic Performance Index Score of 998, which tied three other public elementary schools for the highest elementary school scores in California.

References

External links
 Manchester Gate website

Education in Fresno, California
Public elementary schools in California